The Polish Autocephalous Orthodox Church, commonly known as the Polish Orthodox Church, or Orthodox Church of Poland, is one of the autocephalous Eastern Orthodox churches in full communion. The church was established in 1924, to accommodate Orthodox Christians of Polish descent in the eastern part of the country, when Poland regained its independence after the First World War.

In total, it has approximately 500,000 adherents (2016). In the Polish census of 2011, 156,000 citizens declared themselves as members.

History

Before 1945

The establishment of the church was undertaken after Poland regained independence as the Second Polish Republic following World War I in 1918. Following the Polish–Soviet War and the Treaty of Riga of 1921, Poland secured control of a sizeable portion of its former eastern territories previously lost in the late-18th-century Partitions of Poland to the Russian Empire. Eastern Orthodoxy was widespread in the eastern provinces of interwar Poland. The loss of an ecclesiastical link, due to the persecution of the Russian Orthodox Church in the Soviet Union, left the regional clergy in a crisis, and in 1924 the Ecumenical Patriarchate took over, establishing several autonomous churches on territories of the new states that were formerly wholly or partially part of the Russian Empire: Finland, the Baltic states, and Poland. Earlier, in January 1922, the Polish government had issued an order recognizing the Orthodox church and placing it under the authority of the state. At that time a Ukrainian, Yurii Yaroshevsky, was appointed Metropolitan and exarch by the patriarch of Moscow. When Yaroshevsky began to reject the authority of Moscow Patriarchate, he was assassinated by a Russian monk. Nonetheless, his successor, Dionizy (Waledyński), continued to work for the autocephaly of the Polish Orthodox church, which was finally granted by the Ecumenical Patriarch of Constantinople in his Tomos of 13 November 1924. Most of the parishioners were Ukrainians and Belarusians living in the eastern areas of the newly independent Polish Second Republic. The Patriarch of Constantinople has the only canonical basis to grant the Tomos to new autocephalous churches. Moscow Patriarchate interpretes this otherwise though and considers itself being a successor of the Kyiv Metropolia, the former territory of Kyivan Rus' which Constantinople continued to see as its canonical territory (having agreed to allow Moscow to be its caretaker in 1686). The Russian Orthodox Church at the time did not recognise Constantinople's granting of Polish autocephaly. See History of Christianity in Ukraine#Territories gained by Pereyaslav Rada.

During the interwar period, however, the Polish authorities imposed severe restrictions on the church and its clergy. In the most famous example, the Alexander Nevsky Cathedral in Warsaw was destroyed in the mid-1920s. In Volhynia a total of 190 Eastern Orthodox churches were destroyed and a further 150 converted to Roman Catholicism. Several court hearings against the Pochaiv Lavra also took place.

Since 1945

After the Second World War, the pre-war eastern territories of Poland were annexed by the Soviet Union and included within the Lithuanian, Byelorussian and Ukrainian SSRs. The annexed territories contained up to 80% of the PAOC's parishes and congregation, which were united with the recently re-instated Moscow Patriarchate. The remaining parishes that were now on the territory of the Polish People's Republic were kept by the PAOC, including most of the mixed easternmost territories such as around Chełm and Białystok. In 1948, after the Soviet Union established political control over Poland, the Russian Orthodox Church recognised the autocephalous status of the Polish Orthodox Church.

Although most of the congregation is historically centered in the Eastern borderland regions with considerable Belarusian and Ukrainian minorities, there are now many parishes across the country, as a result of Operation Vistula and other diaspora movements. There are also some adherents in Brazil, resulting from the 1989 canonical union between the hierarchy headed by Metropolitan Gabriel of Lisbon, formerly under the Church of the Genuine Orthodox Christians of Greece, and the Polish Orthodox Church. The European bishops, however, have left the jurisdiction in 2000, which eventually resulted in senior Bishop Chrysostom being raised to archepiscopal dignity. There are now parishes in the states of Rio de Janeiro, Pernambuco and Paraíba, plus a mission in Ceará and a monastery in João Pessoa.

In 2003, following the decision of the Holy Sobor of Bishops of the Polish Autocephalous Orthodox Church, the New Martyrs of Chelm and Podlasie suffering persecution during the 1940s were canonized.

Primates of the Church
The Polish Autocephalous Orthodox Church was established in 1924. Traditionally the primate of the church has the title Metropolitan of Warsaw and All Poland. 
 (Jerzy Jaroszewski) – Archbishop of Warsaw (1921–1923) (Predecessor for establishment of the structure of Polish Autocephalous Orthodox Church)
Metropolitan Dionizy (Dionizy Waledyński) – Metropolitan of Warsaw and All Poland (1923–1948)
 (Makary Oksijuk) – Metropolitan of Warsaw and All Poland (1951–1959)
 (Tymoteusz Szretter) – Metropolitan of Warsaw and All Poland (1961–1962)
 (Stefan Rudyk) – Metropolitan of Warsaw and All Poland (1965–1969)
 (Bazyli Doroszkiewicz) – Metropolitan of Warsaw and All Poland (1970–1998)
Metropolitan Sawa (Sawa Hrycuniak) – Metropolitan of Warsaw and All Poland (1998–present)

Administration

The church is headed by the Archbishop of Warsaw and Metropolitan of All Poland: Sawa (Michał) Hrycuniak (1998–). It is divided into the following dioceses:

Archdioceses and Archbishops 
Archdiocese of Warsaw and Bielsk : Sawa (Hrycuniak)
Archdiocese of Białystok and Gdańsk : Jakub (Kostiuczuk) (2008–)
Archdiocese of Łódź and Poznań : Atanazy (Nos) (2017–)
Archdiocese of Wrocław and Szczecin : George (Pańkowski) (2017–)
Archdiocese of Lublin and Chełm : Abel (Popławski) (2001–)
Archdiocese of Przemyśl and Gorlice : Paisius (Martyniuk) (2016–)
Archdiocese of Rio de Janeiro and Olinda-Recife : Chrysostom (Freire) (1992–)
Diocese of Recife : Ambrose (Cubas) (1996–)

Titular Dioceses and Bishops 
Titular Diocese of Supraśl: Gregory (Charkiewicz) (2008–), Vicar Bishop for Białystok and Gdańsk
Titular Diocese of Siemiatycze: George (Mariusz) Pańkowski (2007–), Ordinary for the Polish Orthodox Military Ordinariate and Vicar Bishop for Warsaw and Bielsk

Other entities 
Polish Orthodox Military Ordinariate

See also
Eastern Orthodox Communion
Supraśl Lavra
Union of Brest
Warsaw Icon Museum

References

External links

Polish Orthodox Church, official site
Polish Orthodox Church Unofficial Site (English)
Polish Orthodox Diocese of Przemyśl-Nowy Sącz (Polish)
Polish Orthodox Diocese of Lublin-Chełm (Polish)
Polish Orthodox Diocese of Białystok-Gdańsk (English)
Polish Orthodox Diocese of Wrocław-Szczecin (Polish)
Polish Orthodox Military Ordinariat (Polish)
Polish Orthodox Diocese of Brazil (Portuguese)
Article by Ronald Roberson on the Polish Orthodox Church on CNEWA website
orthodoxwiki:Church of Poland

 
Eastern Orthodoxy in Poland
Eastern Orthodoxy in Europe
Members of the World Council of Churches
Christian organizations established in 1924
Christian denominations established in the 20th century
Eastern Orthodox organizations established in the 20th century
1924 establishments in Poland